Major General James Henry Gordon,  (born 4 December 1957) is a former British Army officer who served as Commander British Forces Cyprus from 2008 to 2010.

Military career
Educated at Glenalmond College, Gordon was commissioned into the Royal Green Jackets in 1975. He became commanding officer of 2nd Battalion Royal Green Jackets in 1995, Deputy Assistant Chief of Staff (Operational Support) at the Permanent Joint Headquarters in 1998, and Commander British Forces in the Falkland Islands in 2002. He went on to be Chief of Staff at HQ Northern Ireland in 2003, Deputy Commander at the Multi-National Security Transition Command – Iraq in 2006 and Director of Personnel Services (Army) at the Ministry of Defence in early 2008. His last appointments were as Commander British Forces Cyprus and Administrator of the Sovereign Base Areas in October 2008, and as Senior British Loan Services Officer in Oman in January 2011 before retiring in August 2014.

References

|-

 
 
 

1957 births
People educated at Glenalmond College
Commanders of the Order of the British Empire
Companions of the Order of the Bath
British Army major generals
Living people
Royal Green Jackets officers